The Armed Forces Academy of General Milan Rastislav Štefánik, located in Liptovský Mikuláš, is Slovakia's only Military academy.  It was originally established in 1945, right after the end of World War II, first as a High School and from 1973 as a university. AOS has about 500 students, including 50 PhD students. The school is organized in 8 departments:

 Department of Informatics
 Department of Mechanical Engineering
 Department of Electronics
 Department of Logistics
 Department of Social Sciences and Languages
 Department of the Physical Education and Sport
 Department of Security and Defense
 Department of Military Tactics and Operational Art

The academy is named after Milan Rastislav Štefánik, a World War I era Czechoslovak Legion general.

Since 2015, Jozef Puttear, himself an AOS alumnus, has served as the rector of AOS.

References

Universities in Slovakia
Educational institutions established in 1973